The 2019–20 Women's National Cricket League season was the 24th season of the Women's National Cricket League (WNCL), the women's domestic limited overs cricket competition in Australia. Under an expanded schedule, each of the seven teams played eight round robin games, up from the six played by all teams in each of the previous nine seasons. The tournament started on 22 September 2019 and finished on 16 February 2020. Defending champions New South Wales Breakers topped the ladder and met Western Australia in the final, where the latter won by 42 runs to secure their first WNCL title.

Ladder

Fixtures

Round 1

Round 2

Round 3

Round 4

Final

Statistics

Highest totals

Most runs

Most wickets

References

Notes

Bibliography

External links
 WNCL 2019–20 on cricket.com.au
 Series home at ESPNcricinfo

 
Women's National Cricket League seasons
 
Women's National Cricket League